Jerel is a male given name. Notable people with this name include:

 Jerel Blassingame (born 1981), American basketball player
 Jerel Ifil (born 1982), English football player
 Jerel McNeal (born 1987), American basketball player
 Jerel Myers (born 1981), American American football player
 Jerel Worthy (born 1990), American American football player